Luis Martinez Jr. (born February 15, 1990) is an American professional stock car racing driver. He has raced in the NASCAR Nationwide Series.

Racing career
Martinez started to compete in the NASCAR K&N Pro Series West in 2008. He won the series' Rookie of the Year award in 2010, driving for Sunrise Ford Racing. In 2011, he won his first race at Portland International Raceway after David Mayhew overdrove the last corner on the last lap of the race.

Motorsports career results

NASCAR
(key) (Bold – Pole position awarded by qualifying time. Italics – Pole position earned by points standings or practice time. * – Most laps led.)

Nationwide Series

K&N Pro Series West

References

External links
 

1990 births
NASCAR drivers
Living people
Sportspeople from Long Beach, California
Racing drivers from California